Stefan Laufer (born 16. December 1959 in Steinheim) is a German pharmacist and Professor for Pharmaceutical Chemistry at the Eberhard Karls University of Tübingen. Laufer is author of more than 500 publications, author of 15 book chapters and inventor of more than 43 patent families with over 347 international applications.

Biography
From 1980 Laufer studied pharmacy at the University of Regensburg. After completing his practical year, he passed his 3rd state examination of pharmacy in 1985 with which he received his license to practice as a pharmacist (Approbation). He then worked as a scientific employee and doctoral candidate at the chair of Pharmaceutical Chemistry at the University of Regensburg, where he wrote his thesis “5-aminoisoxazole. Synthesis and Cardiovascular Effects” (“5-Aminoisoxazole. Synthese und kardiovaskuläre Wirkung”) under the supervision of assistant professor (Privat-Dozent) Dr. Dannhardt, and was awarded his doctorate with summa cum laude in 1989.

Following his doctorate, he worked as a research assistant at the Institute of Pharmaceutical Chemistry and Biopharmacy at the Johann Wolfgang Goethe University of Frankfurt am Main. Later on he switched to the pharmaceuticals industry, first as head of the drug research department and from 1996 as head of Research & Development and executive board member of Merckle GmbH. At the same time, he had lectureships at the Universities of Frankfurt and Mainz. In 1997 he habilitated at the University of Mainz with his habilitation treatise “Dual Inhibitors of Cyclooxygenase and 5-lipoxygenase: A Concept for the Development of Non-steroidal, Anti-inflammatory Drugs with Few Side Effects” (“Duale Hemmstoffe der Cyclooxygenase und 5-Lipoxygenase: Ein Konzept zur Entwicklung nebenwirkungsarmer nichtsteroidaler Antirheumatika”) and received the venia legendi for pharmaceutical chemistry. His extra occupational qualifications comprise Specialized Pharmacist for Pharmaceutical Analytics (Fachapotheker für Pharmazeutische Analytik), Specialized Pharmacist for Toxicology and Ecology (Fachapotheker für Toxikologie und Ökologie) (1994) and the Advanced Management Program European, INSEAD, Fontainebleau (1998). Since the winter semester 1999/2000 he has held the chair for Pharmaceutical Chemistry at the Eberhard Karls University of Tübingen.

Since he was appointed, Laufer has been conducting academic drug research with a strong translational claim. During this period, he developed three drugs for first use in humans: Licofelone, CBS-3595, Skepinone-L, and, currently, HRX-215 as an MKK4 inhibitor for the treatment of acute and chronic liver disease.
The focus of his research is on inflammation, autoimmunity and cancer with eicosanoid-modulators and protein kinases as the molecular targets. To implement translation, he founded – together with the Robert-Bosch-Foundation – the inter-faculty Center of Pharmacogenomics and Drug Research Tübingen/Stuttgart in 2005, of which he was speaker between 2011 – 2019 and is still an executive board member to date. Furthermore, he has been a member of the Center for Personalized Medicine since 2016, and, in 2015, he co-founded the Tübingen Center for Academic Drug Discovery and Development (TüCAD2) which has been a platform within the Excellence Strategy of the University of Tübingen since 2017.

As a professor for Pharmaceutical Chemistry at the Eberhard Karls University of Tübingen, he has been active in various university boards since his appointment in 1999. He was dean from 2004 to 2006 and vice-chairman of the university council from 2006 to 1015. In the field of teaching, he introduced the diploma course “Pharmaceutical Sciences” in 2003, which became the master course “Pharmaceutical Sciences and Technologies” after the introduction of the Bologna reform.

International activities
Laufer is the founding dean of the German University in Cairo (GUC) which is the first German private university abroad qualifying around 400 pharmacists and biotechnologists every year. Since 2005, he has been director of the Brazil Centre of Baden-Württemberg. He has been a member of the Brazilian Academy of Sciences (Academia Brasileira de Ciências) since 2014, and a member of the scientific council of INCT-INOFAR (Instituto Nacional de Ciências e Tecnologia de Fármacos e Medicamentos) and Visiting Guest Professor at the Universidade Federal do Rio de Janeiro (URFJ).

Memberships
For a long time, Laufer has been involved in the German Pharmaceutical Society (DPhG). He was its president from 2016 to 2019 and vice-president from 2012 to 2015. Since 2002 he has been presiding over the regional group Südwürttemberg-Hohenzollern and currently also over the regional committee Baden-Württemberg. In addition, he has been a board member of the specialist group Pharmaceutical and Medicinal Chemistry since 2008, and also in the shared specialist group with the German Chemical Society (GDCh). Furthermore, he is a member of the Austrian Pharmaceutical Society (ÖPhG) and the American Chemical Society (ACS).

References 

1959 births
Living people
Academic staff of the University of Tübingen
German pharmacists